Peregrina (English: Pilgrim) is a Mexican telenovela produced by Nathalie Lartilleux for Televisa. The series is a remake of the Venezuelan telenovela Kassandra. It premiered on November 14, 2005 and ended on March 31, 2006. It became an unexpected success, garnering ratings in excess of 30 points.

África Zavala starred as protagonist and Eduardo Capetillo starred has a dual role of protagonist/antagonist, while Jacqueline Andere, Cynthia Klitbo and Natasha Dupeyrón starred as antagonists.

Plot
Millionaire Eliseo (Carlos Cámara) and his family are struck by tragedy when his beloved daughter Marisela (África Zavala) is diagnosed with a fatal illness. Marisela becomes pregnant and dies after giving birth to a baby girl.

Widowed, devastated, and lonely, Eliseo marries Victoria (Jacqueline Andere). Victoria is a widow who has two children, identical twins Aníbal and Rodolfo (both played by Eduardo Capetillo). Victoria knows that Marisela's daughter is Eliseo’s heir, and she views her as an obstacle to her sons chances to inherit Eliseo’s fortune.

She takes advantage of the presence of a travelling circus where the fortuneteller’s daughter, Sabina (Helena Rojo), has given birth to a stillborn daughter. Victoria switches the infants; she replaces the stillborn baby with Marisela's daughter, with Delfín as the only witness. Delfín later dies in a mysterious accident.

Years pass and Rodolfo is now a just and kind man, the opposite of his egotistic twin Aníbal. Fate takes him to the circus where he meets Peregrina, a beautiful gypsy dancer. She is the fortuneteller’s granddaughter.

Peregrina is the spitting image of Marisela. Rodolfo and Peregrina fall in love, but her resemblance to his stepfather’s daughter reminds him of the hatred that Victoria feels for Marisela. He decides to forget all about it and leaves without saying a word.

When Peregrina goes looking for Rodolfo at Eliseo’s house, she meets Angélica (Carmen Amezcua), her real mother’s aunt. Angélica takes to Peregrina due to her resemblance to Marisela. Shortly after, Peregrina is victim of an accident and is taken to Eliseo’s house.

Eliseo offers her a home, but Victoria, who knows exactly who Peregrina is, is enraged and so, she reveals her secret to Aníbal.

Taking advantage of the prolonged absence of Rodolfo, Aníbal assumes his identity and proposes marriage to Peregrina. Aníbal confesses to his lover Abigaíl (Cynthia Klitbo) that he is only marrying Peregrina in order to seize the fortune of Eliseo.

Abigaíl gets into a heated fight with him, in which she kills him to prevent his marriage to Peregrina. Peregrina is accused of Aníbal’s homicide.

When Rodolfo returns, she now has to face the only man whom she has ever loved. Rodolfo’s love for her has turned into ferocious revenge.

In the end, Rodolfo tells Peregrina that Aníbal tricked her and that he now knows she is innocent. Peregrina forgives him and moves into the house that Eliseo left her as part of her inheritance. Abigaíl and Evita (Natasha Dupeyrón), her secret daughter, plot against her to get rid of her.

Eventually, Abigaíl is found out to be Aníbal killer and is sent to prison to pay for her crime. Months later, Peregrina and Rodolfo marry in the presence of loving relatives and circus friends.

Cast
 
África Zavala as Peregrina Huerta/Marisela Alcocer
Eduardo Capetillo as Rodolfo Alcocer Castillo/Aníbal Alcocer Castillo
Jacqueline Andere as Victoria Castillo de Alcocer
Helena Rojo as Sabina Huerta
Cynthia Klitbo as Abigail Osorio
Natasha Dupeyrón as Eva "Evita" Contreras Osorio
Víctor Noriega as Eugenio
Ignacio López Tarso as Baltasar
Carlos Cámara as Don Eliseo Alcocer
Carmen Amezcua as Angélica Morales
Tony Bravo as Alonso
Carlos Cámara Jr. as Joaquín
José Carlos Ruiz as Castillo
Guillermo García Cantú as Carreón
Beatriz Aguirre as Jueza Navarro
Salvador Sánchez as Melquíades
Miguel Córcega as Felipe
Alejandro Ibarra as Rubén "Tontín"
Diana Golden as Vicenta
Abraham Ramos as Iván
Malillany Marín as Argelia
Miguel Loyo as Karim
Eduardo Rodríguez as Benjamín
Violeta Isfel as Charito
Catherine Papile as Sandra
Renata Flores as Divina
Miguel Ángel Fuentes as Cuasimodo
Elías Chiprut as Eduardo
María Chacón as Edith
Alberto Chávez as Gregorio
Sara Montes as Fermina
Rosita Quintana as Eloína
Michelle Álvarez as Brenda
Guillermo Capetillo
Raúl Padilla "Chóforo"

Awards and nominations

References

External links

 at esmas.com 

2005 telenovelas
Mexican telenovelas
2005 Mexican television series debuts
2006 Mexican television series endings
Television shows set in Mexico
Televisa telenovelas
Mexican television series based on Venezuelan television series
Spanish-language telenovelas